Pelly Peak, is a  mountain summit in the Russel Range of the Omineca Mountains in northern British Columbia, Canada. Its nearest higher peak is Barrier Peak,  to the east. Precipitation runoff from the mountain drains into Pelly Creek, a tributary of the Ingenika River. Sir John Pelly (1777–1852) served as Governor of Hudson's Bay Company for three decades, and his name is attached to many geographic features in Canada, including but not limited to Pelly River, Pelly Mountains, Pelly Island, Pelly Bay, Mount Pelly, and Fort Pelly. The peak's name was officially adopted June 4, 1953, by the Geographical Names Board of Canada. Based on the Köppen climate classification, Pelly Peak is located in a subarctic climate zone with cold, snowy winters, and mild summers. Temperatures can drop below −20 °C with wind chill factors below −30 °C.

See also

Geography of British Columbia

References

External links
 Weather forecast: Pelly Peak

Two-thousanders of British Columbia
Omineca Mountains
Omineca Country
Cassiar Land District